Stephanie Finch is an American singer, keyboardist and guitarist. She is the wife of Chuck Prophet, with whom she has frequently collaborated and toured. She is a member of Prophet's band, The Mission Express.

Finch provided backing vocals for the Red House Painters songs “Song for a Blue Guitar” and “All Mixed Up”. She released her first solo album, Cry Tomorrow, in 2010.

External links
 "Stephanie Finch: The Power Of Simplicity", a review of Cry Tomorrow by critic Ken Tucker.
 Stephanie Finch branches out on her own
 Stephanie Finch on MySpace

American women guitarists
American women singer-songwriters
American rock songwriters
American women rock singers
Living people
21st-century American women singers
The Mission Express members
Year of birth missing (living people)
21st-century American singers